Gymnocalycium andreae is a species of Gymnocalycium from Argentina.

References

External links
 
 

andreae
Flora of Argentina
Plants described in 1935